Cape Londonderry is the northernmost point of mainland Western Australia, as well as the southwestern corner of the Timor Sea. It lies east of Cape Talbot and northeast of Kalumburu (the nearest settlement), in Western Australia's Kimberley region.

The cape was surveyed by Philip Parker King in 1818 and named after the Marquess of Londonderry, Britain's then Foreign Secretary. Plans to build an airstrip and fishing base there were approved by Western Australia's Environmental Protection Authority in 1992, but are yet to go ahead.

Notes

Coastline of Western Australia
Kimberley (Western Australia)
Extreme points of Western Australia